The initials MDTA may refer to:

The Maryland Transportation Authority, the agency that operates toll facilities in Maryland
Miami-Dade Transit, the public transit authority in Miami-Dade County, Florida
Modern Defensive Tactics Australia, Self defence organisation, Australia